The Sri Lanka Maritime Rescue Coordinating Centre (SLMRCC) is a planned center responsible for coordinating air-sea rescue within the territorial waters of Sri Lanka and international waters. It will be located at the Naval Headquarters with a sub unit based at Hambantota, under a gran from the Government of India.

See also 
 Sri Lanka Navy
 Sri Lanka Coast Guard

References

Rescue coordination centres
Maritime Rescue Co-ordination Centre
Sea rescue organizations